Saint-Malo is a port city in Brittany, France.

Saint Malo may also refer to:

 Malo (saint) (born c. 520), 6th century saint, founder and namesake of the Breton city
 Saint-Malo, Quebec, a municipality in Quebec, Canada
 St. Malo, Manitoba, a town in Manitoba, Canada
 Saint Malo, Louisiana, a former village in Louisiana, USA

See also
 Malo (disambiguation)